Iuliu Oprea (born 2 July 1995 in Ploiești) is a Romanian footballer who plays as a goalkeeper for Liga I club Petrolul Ploiești. He was promoted to the first team in January 2014.

References

1995 births
Living people
Sportspeople from Ploiești
Romanian footballers
FC Petrolul Ploiești players
Liga I players
Association football goalkeepers